The 2007 South American Rugby Championship "B" was the eight edition of the competition of the second level national Rugby Union teams in South America.

The tournament was played in Caracas,

Brazil won  the tournament.

Division B consisted of four teams and was played in Peru. Two points are awarded for a win and one for a draw.

Current Standings

See also
South American Rugby Championship 
CONSUR

External links
History
Brazil and Division B Details

2007
2007 rugby union tournaments for national teams
B
rugby union
rugby union
rugby union
rugby union
International rugby union competitions hosted by Peru